Keith Kendall (born 16 March 1929) is an Australian former cricketer. He played 17 first-class cricket matches for Victoria between 1955 and 1960.

See also
 List of Victoria first-class cricketers

References

External links
 

1929 births
Living people
Australian cricketers
Victoria cricketers
Cricketers from Melbourne